Hoegi Station is a station on Seoul Subway Line 1, Gyeongchun Line and the Gyeongui-Jungang Line. The two island platforms are side-by-side with each other, and are connected by an overpass. This is the closest station to Kyung Hee University, located northwest of here.

References

External links
 Station information from Korail

Metro stations in Dongdaemun District
Seoul Metropolitan Subway stations
Railway stations opened in 1980